The Life of John Maynard Keynes is a non-fiction work by Roy Harrod, about the life of John Maynard Keynes. It was first published in 1951. A paperback edition was published in 1983. The paperback edition of Harrod’s authorized biography of Keynes runs 708 pages. According to the preface of the book, Harrod was solicited by Keynes’s younger brother, the scholar Geoffrey Keynes, to write the biography and thus had full access to Keynes' personal papers and his family. Harrod’s biography does not include any unflattering or controversial aspects of Keynes' life. 

Books about John Maynard Keynes
1951 non-fiction books